Svitlana Vasylivna Tarabarova (born 26 July 1990) is a Ukrainian singer, songwriter, music producer, and actress.

She is the winner of the National Music Award "Song of the Year 2014" and the "Golden Firebird" music award in the Breakthrough of the Year" category. For three years in a row (2017-2019), her songs were chosen as amongst the best songs of the year in the Ukrainian Music Platform Music Award.

Biography
Tarabarova was born on 26 July 1990 in Kherson in a large family. Her father worked in a factory and her mother was a kindergarten teacher. As a child she dreamed of becoming a chauffeur and then a singer. She attended music school and various clubs. At the age of 13 she became a member of the dance group "Oasis". After graduating from school, she moved to Kyiv. She graduated from the Kyiv Municipal Academy of Variety and Circus Arts.

On 11 October 2016, Tarabarova married her director Oleksiy Bondar. On 9 September 2018 she gave birth to a son Ivan and on 23 September 2020, her daughter Mariya was born.

Discography

Studio albums 
 2014: Мир всем
 2015: Вірю.Знаю
 2018: 23:25

Mini album 
 2016: Наодинці

References

1990 births
Living people
Actors from Kherson
Ukrainian television actresses
Ukrainian pop singers
21st-century Ukrainian women singers
Musicians from Kherson